William Robert Green (born 25 October 1973 in Littlehampton) was a rugby union footballer who played at prop for Wasps and Leinster.

Club career

Green began his career at Wasps, making his debut in 1995 and remained there until 2005. Whilst at Wasps he won the Heineken Cup in 2004, the Challenge Cup in 2003 and the domestic Anglo-Welsh Cup (currently known as the LV Cup) in 1999 and 2000. He was also part of the Wasps team which won the Premiership in 1996/97 and a further hat-trick of Premiership titles in 2003, 2004 and 2005. In the summer of 2005 he joined Leinster where he remained until his retirement from the game in 2007.

International career
Green had previously played for various England youth teams alongside the likes of Will Greenwood, Matt Dawson, Simon Shaw and Richard Hill. After making his England debut against Australia in November 1997, Green went on to make 4 appearances for the national team. He was considered an outside candidate to be part of Clive Woodward's ultimately victorious 2003 Rugby World Cup winning squad. However, he was overlooked in the end, despite getting his 4th and final cap against Wales in one of England's warm up games prior to the World Cup, and being in the wider 43-man squad.

Honours

English Champions titles: 4
1996/97, 2002/03, 2003/04, 2004/05
RFU Tetley's Bitter Cup & Powergen Cup / Powergen Anglo Welsh Cup titles: 2
1998/99, 1999/2000
Heineken Cup titles: 1
2003/04
Parker Pen Challenge Cup titles: 1
 2002/03

References

External links
Career profile

1973 births
Living people
England international rugby union players
English rugby union players
Leinster Rugby players
Rugby union players from Littlehampton
Rugby union props
Wasps RFC players